Muraz Giorgadze (born   June 28, 1994) is a Georgian Rugby Union player. His position is wing and he currently plays for Armazi in the Georgia Championship and the Georgia national team.

References

Rugby union players from Georgia (country)
Living people
Rugby union players from Tbilisi
1994 births
Rugby union locks
Georgia international rugby union players